São Tomás de Aquino is a Brazilian municipality in the southwest of the state of Minas Gerais. As of 2020 its population is estimated to be about 7,000. It is named after the Christian philosopher Saint Thomas Aquinas.

References

Municipalities in Minas Gerais